Fox n Forests (stylized as FOX n FORESTS) is a video game developed by German studio Bonus Level Entertainment and published by EuroVideo Medien GmbH for Microsoft Windows, PlayStation 4, Xbox One, and Nintendo Switch. It was released on 17 May 2018. Fox n Forests is a side-scrolling platform game with retro-style graphics.

Gameplay
The player controls Rick, an anthropomorphic fox who is tasked with restoring order to the forest by recovering stolen bark. Players progress through levels with the help of the ability to change seasons instantly, which also consumes magic.

Plot
Rick, a mischievous fox, plays a trick on a bird. As consequence, the bird escorts Rick to the old Season Tree. There, the tree tasks Rick with the mission of recovering stolen bark to restore balance to the forest.

Development
Fox n Forests was the subject of a Kickstarter in 2016, where Bonus Level raised  to fund development.

Reception

Fox n Forests received "mixed or average" reviews across all platforms, according to review aggregator Metacritic. Nintendo Life rated the Switch version a 6/10, praising its use of the "inventive" season-changing mechanic, but criticized its controls and short story. Hardcore Gamer gave the game a 4/5, praising the game's old school graphics. Destructoid (7/10) also enjoyed the graphics and user interface, though criticizing weapon restrictions. PlayStation Universe (9/10) acknowledged: "Chock full of an overwhelming supply of retro-gaming goodness, FOX n FORESTS will take retro fans back to a happier time with an all new adventure to experience."

The Switch version of Fox n Forests sold more copies than other systems: three times more than PC and four times more than PlayStation 4.

Possible remake
On 5 August 2020, it was revealed that a Flash styled reskin of the game, Finnigan Fox, was allegedly in development for the Intellivision Amico.

References

External links

2018 video games
Indie video games
Single-player video games
Kickstarter-funded video games
Windows games
Xbox One games
Platform games
PlayStation 4 games
Nintendo Switch games
Video games about foxes
Video games about birds
Video games set in forests
Video games developed in Germany